Wayne Arthur McIndoe (born 27 August 1972 in Paraparaumu) is a field hockey player from New Zealand, who earned his first cap for the national team, nicknamed The Black Sticks, in 1998 at the Commonwealth Games in Kuala Lumpur.

International Senior tournaments
 1998 – Commonwealth Games
 1999 – Sultan Azlan Shah Cup
 2000 – Sultan Azlan Shah Cup
 2000 – Olympic Qualifying Tournament
 2002 – Commonwealth Games
 2003 – Sultan Azlan Shah Cup
 2003 – Champions Challenge
 2004 – Olympic Qualifying Tournament
 2004 – Summer Olympics
 2004 – Champions Trophy

References

External links
 

1972 births
Living people
New Zealand male field hockey players
Olympic field hockey players of New Zealand
Field hockey players at the 2004 Summer Olympics
Commonwealth Games silver medallists for New Zealand
Commonwealth Games medallists in field hockey
Field hockey players at the 1998 Commonwealth Games
Field hockey players at the 2002 Commonwealth Games
People from Paraparaumu
Medallists at the 2002 Commonwealth Games